Pseudocolaspis villiersi is a species of leaf beetle of Senegal, described by Maurice Pic in 1953.

References 

Eumolpinae
Beetles of Africa
Beetles described in 1953
Taxa named by Maurice Pic
Insects of West Africa